New Milford is a town in Litchfield County, Connecticut, United States. It is the largest town in the state of Connecticut in terms of land area at nearly 63.7 mi² (164.9822 km²). The population as of 2020 was 28,115 according to the 2020 census. The town center is listed as a census-designated place (CDP). The northern portion of the town is part of the region of northwestern Connecticut, and the far eastern portions are part of the Litchfield Hills region.

New Milford consists of a number of town sub-divisions (i.e. districts, communities, or neighborhoods), including Gaylordsville, Meryall, and Northville. The town's infrastructure largely branches off of either side of the highway routes U.S. 7 and U.S. 202, which meet and split within the town and together form its main thoroughfare.

The area constituting contemporary New Milford was originally inhabited by the indigenous Wawyachtonoc people, while the town of New Milford itself was formally established by English colonists in the early 18th century.

During the American Revolution, a number of men from New Milford fought as soldiers in the American Revolutionary War.

During the early- to mid-19th century, New Milford was home to several locations that were part of the Underground Railroad network.

From the late 19th century until roughly the middle of the 20th century, the town saw significant growth in industry. In the 1960s the population of the town increased greatly. The trend of town population growth has continued but slowed since the beginning of the 21st century.

New Milford remains a common destination for visitors from both within the state of Connecticut and out of state, largely owing to its popular downtown; additionally, downtown New Milford is home to a large town green, commonly cited as the longest town green in the state of Connecticut.

New Milford is also frequented on weekends between the months of April and December, when visitors attend the Elephant's Trunk Flea Market, a large outdoor flea market located near the southern end of the town which WRKI has claimed is the largest weekly flea market in New England.

History

Native Americans 

The indigenous Wawyachtonoc people were a sub-group of the Paugussett Nation, and later a Mahican-affiliated Native American tribe, that lived in the area of contemporary New Milford both before and during the colonial era. They had a farming and fishing culture, cultivating corn—mainly by the Housatonic and Still rivers—squash, beans and tobacco, and fished in freshwater areas. They spoke an Algonquian language. The Wawyachtonoc's primary village, "Weantinock", was located near present-day New Milford, along the Housatonic River.

Colonial times
In 1707, John Noble Sr., previously of Westfield, Massachusetts, and his eight-year-old daughter Sarah Noble were the first Anglo-American settlers.  (A public school was later named after Sarah Noble.) They were soon joined by others who had bought land there.

On October 17, 1711, twelve families (including a total about 70 people) petitioned the Connecticut General Assembly to create the town, together with the associated privilege of levying a tax to support a minister. With the legislature's approval, the town was organized the next year. The residents soon secured Daniel Boardman to preach, and he was ordained as the minister of the Congregational Church on November 21, 1716.

In 1722, most of northwestern Connecticut (except for the town of Litchfield) was placed under the jurisdiction of New Haven County.  In 1730, the eastern half of northwestern Connecticut was transferred to the jurisdiction of Hartford County. But New Milford, Salisbury and Sharon continued in New Haven County until the formation of Litchfield County in 1751.

American Revolution
Roger Sherman lived in New Milford before moving to New Haven in 1761. He later became a member of the Continental Congress and signed both the Declaration of Independence and U.S. Constitution. The lot of his former house is the site of the present Town Hall.

During the American Revolution, the 7th Connecticut Regiment (also known as the 19th Continental Regiment) was raised in town on September 16, 1776. The regiment, and the New Milford men in it, would see action in the Battle of Brandywine, Battle of Germantown and the Battle of Monmouth. In total, the town "sent 285 men to fight in the War out of a total population of 2,776."

The Boardman family

 David Sherman Boardman (1768–1864) was the youngest child of Deacon Sherman and Sarah (Bostwick) Boardman. He became a lawyer in town and later chief judge in Litchfield County Court. He served as judge of probate for the district of New Milford in 1805, and held the place by successive annual appointments for sixteen years. He was elected Representative to the General Assembly eight times.
 Elijah Boardman (1760–1823) was a U.S. senator representing Connecticut. Born in New Milford, he was educated by private tutors, and served in the Revolutionary War.
 William Whiting Boardman (1794–1871), a U.S. Representative born in town, was the son of Elijah Boardman. He was a Connecticut state senator in the fourth district, 1830–32, a member of the Connecticut State House of Representatives, 1836–1839, 1845, and 1849–1851; Speaker of the Connecticut State House of Representatives, 1836, 1839, and 1845; US Representative from Connecticut's second district, 1840–1843. He died in New Haven, and is interred at Grove Street Cemetery in New Milford.

19th and 20th centuries
In the second half of the 19th century, many new industries came to town. The Water Witch Hose Company No. 2, local telephone and electricity companies, and newspapers were all founded. Factories in town made buttons, paint and varnish, hats, furniture, pottery, lime, dairy products and pasteboard, among other goods. Tobacco became the major crop in the area, and tobacco warehouses sprang up to handle its storage and processing before sales.

In 1942 Buck's Rock Camp was founded off Bucks Rock Road, and has remained in operation ever since.

The house that inspired the 1946 novel and 1948 film, Mr. Blandings Builds His Dream House, still stands in the Merryall section of town.

21st century
The town has constructed a 1,000,000-gallon sewer plant expansion on West Street, a sewer pump station on Boardman Road, reconstruction of the Rte. 67/ Grove Street Intersection, and ambulance facility on Scovill Street.

The town has added a skate park at Young's Field (2006), reconstructed the tennis and basketball courts at Young's Field (2010), reconstructed the basketball court at Williamson Park in Gaylordsville (2010), and improved Lynn Deming Park (2017), and is working on the New Milford River Trail, which will eventually join the existing 1.5-mile Sega Meadows Park trail (2012), 3.5 miles of River Road, and the 0.25-mile Young's Field River Trail (2017) and link them to the greenways in the neighboring towns of Brookfield and Kent.  Several streetscape projects were completed by the Department of Public Works (DPW) with grant money on Church Street, Whittlesey Avenue, and the west side of East Street (2009/2010). Candlewoof Dog Park is completed on Pickett District Road. A bocce ball court was constructed at the Senior Center by Boy Scout Troop 66 (2012).

National Register of Historic Places sites

 Boardman's Bridge – Boardman Road at Housatonic River, northwest of New Milford (added June 13, 1976)
 Carl F. Schoverling Tobacco Warehouse – 1 Wellsville Avenue (added May 12, 1982)
 E. A. Wildman & Co. Tobacco Warehouse – 34 Bridge Street (added November 20, 1988)
 Hine-Buckingham Farms – 44, 46, and 48 Upland Road, 78, 81 Crossman Road (added June 7, 2004)
 Housatonic Railroad Station – Railroad Street (added April 1, 1984)
 J. S. Halpine Tobacco Warehouse – West and Mill Streets (added 1982)
 John Glover Noble House (added September 29, 1977)
 Lover's Leap Bridge – south of New Milford on Pumpkin Hill Road (added June 13, 1976)
 Merritt Beach & Son Building – 30 Bridge Street (added May 28, 1992)
 Merryall Union Evangelical Society Chapel – Chapel Hill Road (added July 5, 1986)
 New Milford Center Historic District – Bennitt and Elm Streets, Center Cemetery, East, South Main, Mill, and Railroad Streets (added July 13, 1986)
 United Bank Building – 19-21 Main Street (added May 12, 1982)

Geography
New Milford is located on the northeastern shore of Candlewood Lake. The Aspetuck River, Still River and Housatonic River flow through the town.

Principal communities

 Gaylordsville (06755)
 Boardman Bridge
 Lower Merryall
 Merwinsville
 New Milford Center
 Northville
 Park Lane
 Still River
 Upper Merryall
 Lanesville
 Candlewood Hills
 Sunny Valley 
 Pickett District
 Squash Hollow

Climate

New Milford has a humid continental climate, with mild to warm humid summers and cold to very cold winters. The highest recorded temperature was 103 °F (39 °C) in July 1966, while the lowest recorded temperature was −18 °F (−28 °C) in January 1968. Snowfall is generally frequent in winter while average precipitation is most common in September.

Demographics

As of the census of 2010, there were 28,142 people, 10,618 households, and 7,503 families residing in the town. The racial makeup of the town was 91.71% White, 1.72% Black or African American, 0.24% Native American, 2.77% Asian, 0.04% Pacific Islander, 1.65% from other races, and 1.87% from two or more races. Hispanic or Latino of any race was 6.02% of the population.

Of the 10,618 households, 33.4% had children under the age of 18 living with them, 58.0% were married couples living together, 8.8% had a female householder with no husband present, and 29.3% were non-families. 23.0% of all households were made up of individuals, and 7.9% had someone living alone who was 65 years of age or older.  The average household size was 2.62 and the average family size was 3.13.

In the town, the population had 24.30% under the age of 18, 6.87% from 18 to 24, 24.90% from 25 to 44, 31.75% from 45 to 64, and 12.18% who were 65 years of age or older.  The median age was 41.4 years. For every 100 females, there were 97.4 males.  For every 100 females age 18 and over, there were 93.6 males.

As of the 2000 Census the median income for a household in the town was $65,354, and the median income for a family was $75,775. Males had a median income of $50,523 versus $34,089 for females. The per capita income for the town was $29,630.  About 2.1% of families and 3.3% of the population were below the poverty line, including 2.7% of those under age 18 and 5.5% of those age 65 or over.

Religion

New Milford is known for its large church and religious school, the nondenominational Faith Church. It is also home to two Catholic churches; a Lutheran church; a Christian Science community; a longstanding Quaker community; a house of worship belonging to the United Church of Christ; a United Methodist church; and an Assemblies of God (Pentecostal) church; as well the Episcopalian (Anglican) St. John's Episcopal Church, located next to the town green. A Jewish synagogue, Temple Sholom, is located near the town's border with Sherman.

The Canterbury School, a well-known Catholic boarding school, is located near downtown New Milford.

Sports

New Milford is home to the GMS Rowing Center. Founded in 2003, it manages a US Rowing Training Center Program. It has a highly successful Middle and High School (Junior) Program which competes at Youth National Championships, Junior National Team Trials, The "Royal Canadian Henley" and has sent rowers to the Junior World Rowing Championships. In 2011 GMS also had rowers representing the US at the Under 23 World Championships in Amsterdam, The Netherlands and at the World Rowing Championships at Bled, Slovenia.

Education

Elementary schools
 Northville Elementary School
 Hill & Plain Elementary School

Intermediate schools
 Sarah Noble Intermediate School
 Schaghticoke Middle School

High schools
 New Milford High School

Private schools
 Canterbury School
New Milford is home to the Canterbury School, a well-known Roman Catholic boarding school. The school's Chapel of Our Lady features the Jose M. Ferrer Memorial Carillon. 
 Faith Preparatory
 Education without Walls

Infrastructure

Transportation
New Milford is served by fixed-bus routes of the Housatonic Area Regional Transit. The main highways of the town are U.S. Route 7 and U.S. Route 202. 

The long-awaited completion of Super 7 happened in November 2009. The realignment of Grove Street and Prospect Hill Road (Rte. 67) was completed in the fall of 2010. The Department of Public Works (DPW) awarded Stimulus ARRA Project 95-249 Grove Street (south of Anderson Ave) and Boardman Road (west of O+G Quarry). This was completed in the fall of 2010.

There has been continued talk about a proposal to electrify and restore the Danbury Branch of the Metro-North Railroad north of Danbury to New Milford. These efforts have included a Rail Study in 2008, proposed state legislation in 2017, and stimulus money in 2021.

Candlelight Farms Airport is located 3 miles southwest of downtown, featuring a single grass runway and helipad.

Notable people

 Léonie Fuller Adams (1899–1988), poetry consultant to the Library of Congress (now titled poet laureate)
 Charles A. Beard (1874–1948), historian, activist
 Mary R. Beard (1876–1958), historian, activist
 Elizabeth Bentley (1908–1963), spy
 David Sherman Boardman (1768–1864), lawyer, judge and politician
 Elijah Boardman (1760–1823), U.S. senator
 William Whiting Boardman (1794–1871), U.S. congressman
Emily Sophie Brown (1881–1985), one of the first women to serve in the Connecticut House of Representatives
 Kenny Coolbeth (born 1977), motorcycling champion
 Fortunato Depero (1892–1960), painter, writer, sculptor and graphic designer
 Jack Douglas (1908–1989), writer
 Florence Eldridge (1901–1988), stage and screen actress
 Diane von Fürstenberg (born 1946), fashion designer, who plans to be buried at her  farm in town
 Peter Gallagher, actor
 Ethan Hawke (born 1970), actor, writer 
 Lillian Hellman (1905–1984), playwright
 Skitch Henderson (1918–2005), pianist, composer and conductor
 Eric Hodgins (1899–1971), author
 Ian Hunter (born 1939), English singer-songwriter
 Keith Kane, guitarist and founding member of Vertical Horizon
 Eartha Kitt (1927–2008), singer, actress, author
 Columbia Lancaster (1803–1893), U.S. congressman
 Jeremy Levin, businessman, physician and scientist
 Max Lowenthal (1888–1971), lawyer and civil servant
 Fredric March (1897–1975), film and stage actor
 Florence Maybrick (1862–1941), accused murderer, prison reform advocate
 Hap Moran (1901–1994), football player
 Dhan Gopal Mukerji (1890–1936), writer, author, Newbery Medal recipient 1928
 William H. Noble (1788–1850), U.S. congressman
 M. Scott Peck (1936–2005), psychiatrist and self-help author
 Natacha Rambova (1897–1966), costume and set designer, dancer, actress, academic, former wife of Rudolph Valentino
 Thomas Riley, US ambassador to Morocco 2003–2009
 Joan Rivers (1933–2014), comedian, actress, writer, producer
 Roger Sherman (1721–1793), signer of Declaration of Independence and Constitution
 Jean Simmons (1929–2010), British actress
 Eric Sloane (1905–1985), artist
 Walker Todd (1786–1840), lawyer, member of the New York State Senate (2nd D.) and Inspector of Mount Pleasant State Prison
 Solmous Wakeley (1794–1867), pioneer Wisconsin legislator
 Joseph J. Went (born 1930), general
 Horace Wheaton (1803–1882), U.S. congressman
 Theodore White (1915–1986), political author of the 1960s–1970s

Movies filmed in New Milford
The following movies with their actual or expected year of release have been filmed in New Milford:
 The Brass Ring (1983) (TV)
 Mr. Deeds (2002)
 Zero Day (2003)
 What Alice Found (2003)
 The Ballad of Jack and Rose (2005)
 The Six Wives of Henry LeFay (2007)
 The Private Lives of Pippa Lee (2009)
 25/8 renamed to My Soul to Take (2009)

References

External links

New Milford Chamber of Commerce

 
Towns in Litchfield County, Connecticut
Populated places established in 1707
1707 establishments in Connecticut
Towns in the New York metropolitan area
Towns in Connecticut